The 1972 German Grand Prix was a Formula One motor race held at Nürburgring on 30 July 1972. It was race 8 of 12 in both the 1972 World Championship of Drivers and the 1972 International Cup for Formula One Manufacturers.

The 14-lap race was won by Belgian driver Jacky Ickx, driving a Ferrari. Ickx achieved a Grand Chelem – taking pole position, leading every lap and setting the fastest lap. It was his eighth, and final, World Championship race victory, and also Ferrari's only win of the season. Swiss teammate Clay Regazzoni finished second, with Swedish driver Ronnie Peterson third in a March-Ford.

Qualifying

Qualifying classification

Race

Race classification

Championship standings after the race 

Drivers' Championship standings

Constructors' Championship standings

References

German Grand Prix
German Grand Prix
German Grand Prix
German Grand Prix
Sport in Rhineland-Palatinate